The designation Mark 46 can refer to:

 Mark 46 machine gun, lighter weight version of the M249 machine gun
 Mark 46 nuclear bomb, also B46
 Mark 46 torpedo
 Mark 46 30 mm chain gun